Henri Traoré (born 13 April 1983) is a Burkinabé international footballer, who last played for Ghanaian team Ashanti Gold, as a defender.

Club career
Traoré has played in Burkina Faso and Ghana for Étoile Filante de Ouagadougou, AS SONABEL and Ashanti Gold, respectively.

International career
He made his international debut for Burkina Faso in 2005.

References

1983 births
Living people
Burkinabé footballers
Burkina Faso international footballers
2013 Africa Cup of Nations players
Ashanti Gold SC players
Étoile Filante de Ouagadougou players
Association football defenders
21st-century Burkinabé people